The Suru River is a tributary of the Indus River that flows largely through the Kargil district of Ladakh, India. The Suru Valley is coextensive with the Kargil tehsil, with the town of Kargil situated on its banks. The river enters the Kharmang District of Pakistani-administered Gilgit-Baltistan, coursing a brief length before joining the Indus near Marol.

Geography 

The Drang Drung Glacier also gives rise to the Stod River which flows down in the opposite direction from the Suru. The Suru River forms the western and northern boundary of the Zanskar Range. The river flows westwards, along with the Kargil-Zanaskar Road, from its source and forms the Suru valley, which is towered by the massif of Nun Kun mountain. It drains the Nun Kun mountain massif of the Zanskar Range in the Suru valley, and is joined by a tributary "Shafat Nala" at the pastures of Gulmatango. This stream originates from the Shafat Glacier. The Suru River then flows northwards through a deep, narrow gorge to Kargil town, where it is fed by the Botkul River which originates from the glacier of the same name. The Suru River then enters the Pakistani Administered Kashmir  ahead from the point of merger of Dras and Suru rivers through Post 43 and Post 44 of India and Pakistan respectively and merges with the Indus River near Marol.

Most part of the river flows within the jurisdiction of Kargil district. It flows through the towns of Tongul, Suru, Grantung, Goma and Hardas. Kargil town is the largest city situated on the banks of the Suru River, also being the second largest city in the Ladakh region after Leh. A branch of the anicient Silk Road ran alongside the Suru River, connecting Kargil and Skardu. The road is now closed due to the Line of Control.

The Suru River has extensive possibilities for rafting and it is practised during the summer. The Suru Valley is the starting point for rafting trips, and it also provides a base for mountaineering expeditions to the Nun Kun mountain massif.

Agriculture in Ladakh is scarce due to the dry climate, and is restricted to the river valleys. The Suru valley, formed by the catchment of the Suru River, receives irrigation through the canals of the Suru River. The main crops grown in the valley include barley, buckwheat, turnips and mustard.

References

External links 

 

Rivers of Ladakh
Indus basin
Rivers of India